Edis Elkasević (born February 18, 1983) is a Bosnian-born Croatian athletics coach and retired shot putter.

He won the 2002 World Junior Championships. He did not quite adapt to an international senior level, but competed at the 2004 Olympic Games and the 2005 World Championships without reaching the final.

His personal best throw is 20.94 metres, achieved in June 2005 in Velenje. With the junior shot (6 kg) he has 21.96 metres, achieved in June 2002 in Zagreb. This was the junior world record until June 2009, when it was surpassed by David Storl. He also has 60.54 metres in the discus throw, achieved in May 2005 in La Jolla, California.

Since 2013, Elkasević coaches Sandra Perković, a multiple World, Olympic and European discus throw champion.

References

1983 births
Living people
People from Prijedor
Croatian male shot putters
Athletes (track and field) at the 2004 Summer Olympics
Athletics (track and field) coaches
Olympic athletes of Croatia
Mediterranean Games gold medalists for Croatia
Athletes (track and field) at the 2005 Mediterranean Games
Mediterranean Games medalists in athletics

 
Bosniaks of Croatia